Mount Kissane (Jbel Kissane) is a mountain in southeastern Morocco, in the region of Drâa-Tafilalet. It is a distinctive mountain located in the Anti-Atlas range along the valley of the Draa River.

Toponymy
The word Kissane كيسان means "glasses" in Arabic and the mountain is so named because it is deemed to look like the glasses of tea behind a tea pot in the Moroccan style of serving tea.(source?)

Geography
Mount Kissane is a small rocky mountain range with a synclinal pattern. It has a length of 14 km and a maximum width of about 1.8 km. On the top of the mountain there are two ridges cut by a ravine in the middle. There are several peaks; the highest summit is located at the western end of the range, reaching 1485 m.

Importance in the region
The Jbel Kissane is a characteristic mountain whose shape dominates the eastern landscape of the town of Agdz. Its bare rock takes a variety of pastel hues such as pink, salmon and violet, depending from the angle of the sunlight and the time of the day. It is as well a dominant feature of the panoramic views from nearby villages such as Ouliz, Taliouine, Ait Ali, Tinfoula, Aremd, Tisserghate, Ait el Kharj, Igamodene, Tamnougalt, Talate, Talamzit, Timiderte, Ighrghr and Afra.

Features

References

External links

Que faire à Agdz ?
Through the Tichka

Kissane
Geography of Drâa-Tafilalet